The History Man is a British  television drama series which aired in four parts on BBC2 in 1981. It is based on Malcolm Bradbury's 1975 novel of the same title.

Cast
 Antony Sher as Howard Kirk
 Geraldine James as Barbara Kirk
 Isla Blair as Flora Beniform
 Laura Davenport as Annie Callendar
 Paul Brooke as  Henry Beamish
 Veronica Quilligan as Felicity Phee
 Maggie Steed as Myra Beamish
 Zienia Merton as  Miss Ho
 Lloyd Peters as  Michael Bernard 
 Julia Swift as  Beck Pott
 Steve Plytas as Professor Mangel
 Jonathan Bruton as Martin Kirk
 Charlotte Enderby as Celia Kirk
 Miriam Margolyes as Melissa Tordoroff
 Elizabeth Proud as  Moira Millikin 
 Graham Padden as John McIntosh 
 Michael Hordern as Professor Marvin
 Peter-Hugo Daly as  George Carmody 
 Arthur Lugo as Hashmi Sadeck
 Henry Moxon as Dr. Petworth
 Judy Liebert as Jane McIntosh
 Milo Sperber as  Dr. Zachery 
 Bill Buffery as  Peter Madden
 Juliet Waley as  Marjorie
 Jack Elliott as  Leon
 Jane Slaughter as Joanna
 Chloe Salaman as  Anne Petty
 Jane Galloway as  Chloe

References

Bibliography
 Linda Hutcheon & Siobhan O'Flynn. A Theory of Adaptation. Routledge, 2013.

External links
 

1981 British television series debuts
1981 British television series endings
1980s British drama television series
BBC television dramas
Television shows based on British novels
1980s British television miniseries
1980s college television series
British college television series
English-language television shows